Raja Bhoj Airport  is a domestic airport serving Bhopal, the capital of the state of Madhya Pradesh, India. Named after the 10th century Paramara king, Raja Bhoj, it is the second busiest airport in Madhya Pradesh after Devi Ahilya Bai Holkar Airport in Indore in terms of passenger and aircraft movements.

The airport is also near the intersection of National Highway 46 (which forms a ring road around Bhopal) and State Highway 18, which connects Bhopal to Indore. The airport will get a Maintenance, Repair and Overhaul (MRO) facility, due to its advantageous central location in India.

Development

Runway

The first direct seasonal international flight from Bhopal was to Jeddah, a Hajj charter flown by Saudia on 23 October 2010 for Hajj travellers.

Renewable energy

In 2013, the airport became the first airport in the state to use solar power for running its utility grid system. A 100-kilowatt solar power plant was made operational in June 2013, with plans to install a 2-megawatt solar power plant at the airport in the future. The airport has night landing facilities, an Instrument Landing System (ILS) and CAT VII fire services.

Cargo and Logistics hub

A new Air Cargo Hub is being planned with 17 acres of land sanctioned near the airport for the same. For now, the old terminal building is being redeveloped into a Cargo Complex to increase cargo operations from the capital airport. The temporary Air Cargo Complex will be inaugurated by October 2019.

Maintenance, Repair, and Overhaul (MRO) Facility
Bhopal airport has been selected as one of the eight new destinations to set up Maintenance, Repair, and Overhaul (MRO) facilities in India. The airport's central location throughout the country provides ample growth and logistics prospects for the facility.

Immigration check post and International flights

In September, the DGCA started the process for granting international status to Raja Bhoj airport. In November 2019, a joint central team composed of members of the Ministry of Home Affairs and Ministry of Civil Aviation visited the airport to review the arrangements in starting immigration facilities, and did not find any major hurdles. With this, the airport is all set to become an immigration check post, which is a mandatory requirement for operating international flights.

Selfie Point - Say Yes To Life

Bhopal airport established a selfie point of glorifying life's importance in any difficulties.Raja Bhoj airport supported the campaign 'Say Yes To Life' run by eminent psychiatrist Dr Satyakant Trivedi(psychiatrist in Bhopal) who is a member of suicide prevention task force, Madhya Pradesh.

Integrated terminal
The integrated terminal building worth Rs 1.35 billion was inaugurated on 28 June 2011 by the then Civil Aviation minister, Vayalar Ravi. The state government had given 400 acres of land for the construction of the international terminal.

It also has twenty-two customs counters, 11 for arrival and 11 for departure, and six X-ray machines for security. The terminal, now, also has an eatery and a few retail stores, that were developed as part of the Airport Authority of India (AAI) scheme of the master concessionaire. The terminal is connected with 4 aerobridges.

Airlines and destinations

Statistics

Accidents and incidents
 On 27 March 2021, a trainer aircraft crashed on the outskirts of Bhopal airport. Shortly after takeoff the pilot in command faced some problems in the aircraft and contacted Bhopal ATC for an emergency landing. The flight couldn't reach the runway and crashed in an open field 8 km away from Bhopal airport.

See also
 Bhopal
 Devi Ahilya Bai Holkar Airport
 Jabalpur Airport
 Gwalior Airport
 Khajuraho Airport
 List of airports in India
 List of the busiest airports in India

References

External links

Raja Bhoj Airport (Airports Authority of India web site)

Transport in Bhopal
Buildings and structures in Bhopal
Airports in Madhya Pradesh
World War II sites in India
Year of establishment missing